Kathryn Louise Taylor (born September 29, 1955) was elected the 38th mayor of Tulsa, Oklahoma on April 4, 2006, in the city's largest voter turnout for a mayoral election.  She defeated Republican incumbent Mayor Bill Lafortune to become Tulsa's second female mayor, after Susan Savage first filled the post in 1992. Taylor is married to Bill Lobeck, CEO of Vanguard Automotive Group. Taylor served as Oklahoma Secretary of Commerce and Tourism in Governor Brad Henry's administration from 2003 to 2006.  She resigned from that post in order to run for Mayor.

Early life
Taylor grew up in Oklahoma City, Oklahoma and graduated from John Marshall High School. Taylor earned her bachelor's degree as well as her Juris Doctor from the University of Oklahoma.

Taylor worked as an attorney for a private firm in Oklahoma City from 1981 until 1988. She then moved to Tulsa in 1989 and became vice president and general counsel of Thrifty Car Rental. Taylor eventually bought National Car Rental from General Motors. She and her husband eventually sold the company and started the Lobeck Taylor Foundation. Taylor was appointed in 2003 by Governor Brad Henry to serve as Secretary of Commerce, Tourism, and Workforce Development.

Mayor of Tulsa
As Mayor, Taylor oversaw the completion of Tulsa's "Vision 2025" projects including the BOK Center.  Taylor also pushed a successful $450 million street bond issue and construction of a new downtown baseball park.  She oversaw the closing down of Bell's Amusement Park in 2006. Tulsa County terminated Bell's lease.  Neither the City of Tulsa nor Mayor Taylor were involved.

She supervised the move of Tulsa's city hall.  On June 4, 2009, Taylor abruptly announced that she would not seek re-election.  On September 30, 2009, Oklahoma Governor Brad Henry announced that Taylor would become his top education adviser after her term as mayor ended on December 7.  Taylor subsequently led Oklahoma's two unsuccessful applications for federal program funds in the "Race to the Top" competition. Taylor was inducted into the Oklahoma Women's Hall of Fame in 2011.

In January 2013, Taylor announced that she would run again for her old job as mayor of Tulsa in the 2013 election.  In the mayoral primary election on June 11, 2013, in which the city used a new non-partisan election system for the first time, Taylor finished first with 42.1% of the vote, ahead of her successor Dewey F. Bartlett Jr., who had 34.2%.  She and Bartlett met in a runoff election on November 12, 2013,  and Bartlett prevailed, receiving about 55% of the vote.

References

External links
2013 Campaign website
Oklahoma Women's Hall of Fame Oral History Project -- OSU Library

|-

|-

1955 births
Harvard Institute of Politics
Heads of Oklahoma state agencies
Living people
Mayors of Tulsa, Oklahoma
Oklahoma Democrats
State cabinet secretaries of Oklahoma
Women in Oklahoma politics
Women mayors of places in Oklahoma
21st-century American politicians
21st-century American women politicians
Candidates in the 2013 United States elections